Photography in India refers to both historical as well as to contemporary photographs taken in modern-day India.

Photography was introduced in India by the British in the early 19th century. The earliest photographers were patronized by the British government and the rulers of the princely states.

Colonial period 

Photography was introduced in India by the British in the early 19th century. Notable photographers such as Felice Beato and Samuel Bourne spent several years in India, photographing Indian people and architecture. Beato covered the Indian Rebellion of 1857 in various cities, and his work is a pioneering effort of war photography. Bourne set up Bourne & Shepherd in 1863, and extensively photographed thousands of images of the architecture and landscapes of India.

The British also conducted efforts to photograph the various castes and tribes of India, as a way of categorising the various people of India, with racist and Orientalist undertones. The People of India was a multi-volume study which contained hundreds of such images. The early photographers thus presented a highly exoticised view of India, intended to further the colonial agenda.

Lala Deen Dayal was one of the few native Indian photographers of the 19th century, and the most prolific. In the 1880s, he was appointed the court photographer to the Nizam of Hyderabad.

Photographers such as Kulwant Roy and Kanu Gandhi also documented the events of the Indian Independence movement.

Post-Independence 
Homai Vyarawalla was one of the notable Indian photojournalists of the 20th century.

In 2020, Dar Yasin, Mukhtar Khan and Channi Anand became the first Indian photographers to win the Pulitzer Prize for their coverage of the protests in Kashmir.

See also 

 National Photography Awards
 History of Photography in India

References

Further reading 

 
 

Photography in India